Osyedərə (also, Osyodərə, Os’yadarya, Os’yedara, and Os’yedere) is a village in the Lerik Rayon of Azerbaijan.  The village forms part of the municipality of Bilavər.

References 

Populated places in Lerik District